Andrew or Andy Henderson may refer to:

 A. A. (Andrew Augustus) Henderson (1816-1875), navy surgeon and specimen collector
 Andrew Henderson (writer) (died 1775), Scottish writer
 Andrew Henderson (portrait painter) (1783–1835), Scottish portrait painter
 Andrew Henderson (schoolmaster) (1797–1869), school teacher in Nova Scotia, Canada
 Andrew Kennaway Henderson (1879–1960), New Zealand clerk, illustrator, cartoonist, editor and pacifist
 Andrew Henderson (English cricketer) (born 1941), former English cricketer
 Andrew Henderson (Scottish cricketer) (1922–2020), Scottish cricketer
 Andrew Henderson (botanist) (born 1950), English-born palm systematist
 Andrew Henderson (rugby league) (born 1979), English rugby league footballer
 Andrew Henderson (rugby union) (born 1980), Scottish rugby union footballer
 Andy Henderson (soccer) (born 19??), Australian football (soccer) player and coach
 Andy Henderson (Scottish footballer) (active 1914–1919), Scottish football goalkeeper
 Andy Henderson (EastEnders)